Thalakkulathur  is a small village near Kozhikode city on the road to Atholi,_Kerala.

Demographics
 India census, Thalakkulathur had a population of 29388 with 13753 males and 15635 females.

History
Thalakkulthur is supposed to have got this name from the pond used for ritualistic purposes by the priests of Zamorin dynasty located here.

Temples
 Vazhani Temple
 Thalakkulathoor Temple
 Vellikkulangara Temple
 Palora Shiva Temple
 Itharakkuni Shiva Temple
 Mattath Shiva Temple
 Purakkattiri Old Juma Masjidh
 cherukattu kannikkan 
 Shri Palora Shiva Temple
 Mathilakam shri Narasimha Moorthi Temple
 Modappilavil shri bhagavathi temple
 Sree Manathanathi nagakaali temple

Mosque
 Purakkattiry jumua masjid
 Salafi masjid Purakkattiry
 Noor Masjid Kachery
 Thaniyadath jumua masjid near bypass
 Parambath old jumua masjid 
 Masjidul hamad Parambath
 Masjidul Fathima andikode
 Masjidul irshad padannakkalam
 Masjid aboobacker sidheeq annasseey road
 Masjidul Thaqwa vk road
 Annasseey jumua masjid 
 Thoonumannil masjid 
 Edakkara jumua masjid near up school

Shri Palora Shiva temple is a popular religious destination of Thalakkulathur.  It is about two km west of Purakkittiri town.  The road to the river takes you to the temple after crossing the newly built highway.  There is a small underpass for crossing the highway.  The temple is built inside a calm residential zone and has sylvan surroundings.  It is east facing and is a little elevated from the road.

Image gallery

References

Villages in Kozhikode district
Kozhikode north